This article is the discography of British dance-pop band Londonbeat and includes all the studio albums, compilations, their only remix album and the singles, as well as the peak chart positions for the United States, Australia, Germany, Ireland, Netherlands, New Zealand, Sweden1, Switzerland and United Kingdom.

NOTES:
1 - In Sweden the albums chart is divided into Top Fullprice Albums (reported in this page) and Top Midprice Albums. Furthermore, prior September 1993, the charts were bi-weekly.

Discography

Studio albums

Compilations

Other albums

Singles

References
Official Website Londonbeat

Pop music discographies
Discographies of American artists